Bramhall railway station serves the district of Bramhall in the Metropolitan Borough of Stockport, Greater Manchester, England. The station is 9¾ miles (16 km) south of Manchester Piccadilly on the Stafford to Manchester Line and was opened in 1845 by the London and North Western Railway.

Facilities

There is a ticket machine, staffed ticket office and waiting room on platform 1 (the Manchester-bound side). Train running information is provided by CIS displays on both platforms.

Services

The Sunday service from the station is limited, with just six trains each way.

References

External links

Railway stations in the Metropolitan Borough of Stockport
DfT Category E stations
Former London and North Western Railway stations
Railway stations in Great Britain opened in 1845
Northern franchise railway stations